Pudas is a surname. Notable people with the surname include:

Albert Pudas (1899–1976), Finnish-Canadian ice hockey player and coach
Jonathan Pudas (born 1993), Swedish ice hockey player
Rauli Pudas (born 1954), Finnish pole vaulter